The Guy Fawkes mask (also known as the V for Vendetta mask or Anonymous mask) is a stylised depiction of Guy Fawkes (the best-known member of the Gunpowder Plot, an attempt to blow up the House of Lords in London on 5November 1605) created by illustrator David Lloyd for the 1982–1989 graphic novel V for Vendetta. Inspired by the use of a mask representing Fawkes being burned on an effigy having long previously had roots as part of Guy Fawkes Night celebrations, Lloyd designed the mask as a smiling face with red cheeks, a wide moustache upturned at both ends, and a thin vertical pointed beard, worn in the graphic novel's anarchist protagonist V. 

Following the release of the graphic novel and its 2005 film adaptation, this design came to represent broad protest, later also becoming a symbol for the online hacktivist group Anonymous after appearing in web forums, used in Project Chanology, the Occupy movement, Anonymous for the Voiceless, the fictional F-Society in Mr. Robot, and other anti-establishment protests around the world. This has led to the mask also being known by the popular name of the Anonymous mask.

Origins

The Gunpowder Plot of 1605 was commemorated from early on by burning effigies of unpopular figures. Towards the end of the 18th century, reports appeared of children begging for money with grotesquely masked effigies of Guy Fawkes, and 5November gradually became known as Guy Fawkes Night, although many now prefer the term "Bonfire Night". From the 1864 Chambers Book of Days:

In 1847, The Lancet published "Notes of A Case of Death From Fright," in which the death of a two-year-old was attributed to the fright caused by seeing a boy wearing a red Guy Fawkes mask.

In the 20th century, in the UK, large numbers of cheap cardboard or paper Guy Fawkes masks were sold to children each autumn or given out free with comics; by the 1980s their popularity became increasingly supplanted by Halloween. In 1958, wearing Guy Fawkes masks was mentioned during a debate in the Parliament of Western Australia as an example of harmless and excusable (though technically unlawful) possession of a face mask at night. J.J. Brady said, "at one time it was traditional to wear masks on Guy Fawkes night. So, if tonight anyone is found wearing a Guy Fawkes mask I, as Minister for Police, will see that he is duly excused."

The British comic book series V for Vendetta, which started in 1982, "centers on a vigilante's efforts to destroy an authoritarian government in a dystopian future United Kingdom". When developing the story, illustrator David Lloyd made a handwritten note on the intend anarchist protagonist, V: "Why don't we portray him as a resurrected Guy Fawkes, complete with one of those papier-mâché masks, in a cape and a conical hat? He'd look really bizarre and it would give Guy Fawkes the image he's deserved all these years. We shouldn't burn the chap every Nov. 5th but celebrate his attempt to blow up Parliament!" Writer Alan Moore commented that, due to Lloyd's idea, "All of the various fragments in my head suddenly fell into place, united behind the single image of a Guy Fawkes mask." He also noted "how interesting it was that we should have taken up the image right at the point where it was apparently being purged from the annals of English iconography." As such, V wears a Guy Fawkes mask (as designed by Lloyd) throughout the story, and in the climax of its 2005 film adaptation and 2022 third season of its prequel television series, thousands of protesters adopt the same costume as they march on Parliament.

Adoption by 21st century protesters

Background
Since the 2005 release of the film V for Vendetta and the mass production of David Lloyd's mask design by Warner Bros., the use of Guy Fawkes masks has become widespread internationally among groups protesting against politicians, banks, and financial institutions. The masks both conceal the identity and protect the face of individuals and demonstrate their commitment to a shared cause.

On 17 April 2006 a pair of rival groups wearing Fawkes masks confronted each other outside the New York City offices of Warner Brothers and DC Comics. One group, led by freegan Adam Weismann, protested against a perceived misrepresentation of the Anarchist movement in the film V for Vendetta. The other group, led by libertarian Todd Seavey, counter-protested against the anarchists, wearing masks purportedly supplied by a Time Warner employee.

Anonymous

The mask became associated with the hacktivism group Anonymous's Project Chanology protests against the Church of Scientology in 2008. The group protested the Church of Scientology in response to the Church forcing YouTube to pull a video of Tom Cruise discussing Scientology that was meant for internal use within the Church. In response, Anonymous protested the litigious methods of the Church of Scientology over a period of several months. Protesters were encouraged to hide their faces, since it was common practice for Church members to photograph anti-Scientology protesters. The Guy Fawkes mask was a widely used method of hiding faces.

As the protests continued, more protesters began opting to use the Guy Fawkes mask, which eventually took on symbolic status within the group. Scott Stewart of University of Nebraska at Omaha's The Gateway wrote: "Many participants sported Guy Fawkes masks to draw attention both to their identity as Anonymous and the Church of Scientology's abuse of litigation and coercion to suppress anti-Scientology viewpoints." The Internet-based group then adopted the character for its wider protests against authority. A version of the mask was later used in the 2015 television series Mr. Robot to represent the hacktivist group F-Society, in reference to Anonymous.

Wider use in popular protest
On 23 May 2009, protesters wearing the mask detonated a fake barrel of gunpowder outside Parliament while protesting over the issue of British MPs' expenses.

During the 2011 Wisconsin protests, and then during the subsequent Occupy Wall Street and the ongoing Occupy movement, the mask appeared internationally as a symbol of popular rebellion. In October 2011, campaigner Julian Assange attended the Occupy London Stock Exchange protest wearing such a mask, which he removed after a request by the police.

In January 2012, Guy Fawkes masks were used by protesters against Poland's signing of ACTA.

On 10 June 2012, in Mumbai, India, a group of 100 Anonymous members and college students gathered at Azad Maidan, dressed all in black and wearing Guy Fawkes masks, to protest against the Indian Government's censorship of the Internet.

The mask, used by Bahraini protesters during the Arab Spring-inspired Bahraini uprising, was banned in the country in February 2013, a few months after a similar decision by United Arab Emirates, another Persian Gulf country. The Industry and Commerce Ministry of Bahrain said the ban on importing the mask, which it referred to as "revolution mask", was due to concerns over "public safety". The decision, described by Voice of America as "unusual", marked one of the latest in government efforts to suppress the two-year-old uprising. However, a British-based rights activist and Samuel Muston of The Independent downplayed the effect of the ban. The Manama Voice reported that use of mask in protests increased following the ban.

The masks were used by anti-government protesters in Thailand in 2012, and by protesters in Turkey in 2013. They were also used in protests in Brazil and Egypt in 2013.

In May 2013, the government of Saudi Arabia banned the importation of the masks, and said it would confiscate any found to be for sale. The Ministry of Islamic Affairs stated that the mask is "a symbol of rebels and revenge", and warned imams and parents that "they could be used to incite the youth to destabilize security and spread chaos..." On 22 September 2013, Saudi religious police prohibited the wearing of the Guy Fawkes mask, the day before Saudi Arabia's 83rd National Day.

The wearing of masks during a riot or unlawful assembly has been banned in Canada, following the enactment of Bill C-309, and now carries a maximum ten-year prison sentence.

Participants in the 2014 Venezuelan protests carried a wide variety of masks; one of them was the Guy Fawkes mask, sometimes painted with the colours of the Venezuelan flag.

In October 2019 protesters in Hong Kong started using the mask in opposition to the government's banning the use of masks during protests.

Guy Fawkes masks were among the symbols displayed during the 2021 storming of the United States Capitol.

Views of Moore and Lloyd
Alan Moore, anarchist and author of V for Vendetta, has supported use of the mask, and stated in a 2008 interview with Entertainment Weekly, "I was also quite heartened the other day when watching the news to see that there were demonstrations outside the Scientology headquarters over here, and that they suddenly flashed to a clip showing all these demonstrators wearing V for Vendetta Guy Fawkes masks. That pleased me. That gave me a warm little glow." Whilst Moore did not create such a character for the purposes it has served he explains to The Guardian, "suppose when I was writing V for Vendetta I would in my secret heart of hearts have thought: wouldn't it be great if these ideas actually made an impact? So when you start to see that idle fantasy intrude on the regular world... It's peculiar. It feels like a character I created 30 years ago has somehow escaped the realm of fiction."

V for Vendetta illustrator and co-creator David Lloyd:

Sales and corporate ownership of rights
According to Time in 2011, the protesters' adoption of the mask had led to it becoming the top-selling mask on Amazon.com, selling hundreds of thousands a year. Warner Bros. Discovery, which owns Warner Bros. and DC Comics, owns the rights to the image and is paid a fee with the sale of each official mask.

See also
 Anti-mask law
 Richard Nixon mask

References

Further reading

External links

Anonymous (hacker group)
Cultural depictions of Guy Fawkes
Masks in Europe
Internet memes
Halloween costume
Political masks
V for Vendetta